Dan Hill is an album by Canadian musician Dan Hill. It was released in 1987 on Columbia Records. It is Hill's eighth album in all, and his second eponymous release, following his 1975 debut album.

The lead single from the album was a duet with Vonda Shepard, "Can't We Try", which peaked at No. 6 on the Billboard Hot 100. Along with "Can't We Try", two other tracks, "Never Thought (That I Could Love)" and "Carmelia", also reached the top ten of the Billboard Adult Contemporary chart.

Track listing 
 "Conscience" (Dan Hill, John Capek) – 3:54
 "Carmelia" (Hill, Capek) – 3:51
 "Can't We Try" (Duet with Vonda Shepard) (Hill, Beverly Chapin-Hill) – 4:02
 "Blood in My Veins" (Hill, Warren Pash) – 3:51
 "Never Thought (That I Could Love)" (Hill) – 3:36
 "Every Boys Fantasy" (Hill, Gabe Lee) – 3:26
 "Lose Control" (Hill, Capek) – 3:48
 "Perfect Love" (Hill, Barry Mann, Scott Cutler) – 4:49
 "Pleasure Centre" (Hill, John Sheard) – 3:50
 "USA/USSR" (Hill, Sheard) – 3:50

Personnel 
 Dan Hill – lead vocals, backing vocals (1-4, 6-10)
 John Capek – keyboards (1, 2, 7), synth bass (1, 2), drum programming (1, 2, 7-10)
 John Sheard – synth bass (1, 5, 8, 9, 10), backing vocals (1, 2, 8, 9), keyboards (2-6, 8, 9), string arrangements (3, 5)
 Michael Landau – guitars (1-5, 8, 9, 10)
 Tony Riparetti – guitars (4, 6, 7)
 Nathan East – bass (2, 3, 6)
 Reggie McBride – bass (7)
 Craig Krampf – percussion (1, 2, 10), drums (3-6) 
 David Woodford – alto saxophone (2)
 Vonda Shepard – lead vocals (3)

Production 
 John Capek – producer 
 Hank Medress – producer (1-6, 8, 9, 10), vocal producer 
 Paul Ratajczak – engineer (1-6, 8, 9, 10)
 Scott Singer – engineer (7), mixing (7)
 Michael Hutchinson – mixing (1, 2, 4, 8)
 David Thoener – mixing (3, 5, 6, 9, 10)
 Kevin Doyle – assistant engineer
 Darwin Foye – assistant engineer 
 John Naslen – assistant engineer 
 Rick Starks – assistant engineer
 Bob Ludwig – mastering 
 John Sheard – music director 
 Lisa Roy – production coordinator 
 Stacy Drummond – art direction, design 
 Nancy Levine – photography

Studios
 Recorded at Manta Sound and Sounds Interchange (Toronto, Ontario, Canada); Ground Control Studios and El Dorado Recording Studios (Burbank, California, USA).
 Mastered at Masterdisk (New York City, New York, USA).

In popular culture
The songs "Can't We Try" and "Never Thought (That I Could Love)" were both used on the American daytime drama Santa Barbara.

References

1987 albums
Dan Hill albums
Columbia Records albums